Acoustic foam is an open celled foam used for acoustic treatment. It attenuates airbone sound waves, reducing their amplitude, for the purposes of noise reduction or noise control. The energy is dissipated as heat. Acoustic foam can be made in several different colors, sizes and thickness.

Acoustic foam can be attached to walls, ceilings, doors, and other features of a room to control noise levels, vibration, and echoes. 

Many acoustic foam products are treated with dyes and/or fire retardants.

Uses 
The objective of acoustic foam is to improve or change a room’s sound qualities by controlling residual sound through absorption. This purpose requires strategic placement of acoustic foam panels on walls, ceilings, floors and other surfaces. Proper placement can help effectively manage resonance within the room and help give the room the desired sonic qualities.

Acoustic enhancement 
The objective of acoustic foam is to enhance the sonic properties of a room by effectively managing unwanted reverberations. For this reason, acoustic foam is often used in restaurants, performance spaces, and recording studios. Acoustic foam is also often installed in large rooms with large, reverberative surfaces like gymnasiums, churches, synagogues, theaters, and concert halls where excess reverberation is prone to arise. The purpose is to reduce, but not entirely eliminate, resonance within the room. In unmanaged spaces without acoustic foam or similar sound absorbing materials, sound waves reflect off of surfaces and continue to bounce around in the room. When a wave encounters a change in acoustic impedance, such as hitting a solid surface, acoustic reflections transpire. These reflections will occur many times before the wave becomes inaudible. Reflections can cause acoustic problems such as phase summation and phase cancellation. A new complex wave originates when the direct source wave coincides with the reflected waves. This complex wave will change the frequency response of the source material.

Functionality 
Acoustic foam is a lightweight material made from polyurethane (either polyether or polyester) or extruded melamine foam. It is usually cut into tiles. One surface of these tiles often features pyramid, cone, wedge, or uneven cuboid shapes. Acoustic foam tiles are suited to placing on sonically reflective surfaces to act as sound absorbers, thus enhancing or changing the sound properties of a room.

This type of sound absorption is different from soundproofing, which is typically used to keep sound from escaping or entering a room rather than changing the properties of sound within the room itself. 

Acoustic foam panels typically suppress reverberations in the mid and high frequencies. To deal with lower frequencies, much thicker pieces of acoustic foam (often in metal or wood enclosures) can be placed in the corners of a room and are called acoustic foam bass traps.

See also
 Anechoic chamber
 Bushing (isolator)
 Polystyrene
 Polyurethane
 Sorbothane
 Soundproofing
 Styrofoam
 Vibration isolation

References

Acoustics
Foams
Noise reduction
Noise control